Cleve Chafin (March 4, 1885 – December 10, 1959) was a carnival musician who recorded old-time music during the 1920s.

Biography
Chafin was from Wayne County, West Virginia, the son of Alice Adkins and Bob Chafin.  He first recorded a solo session in Richmond, Indiana for Gennett Records on November 16, 1927, but the recordings were never issued. He may also have recorded a session for Paramount Records in 1928 with two men named Stevens and Bolar as Fruit Jar Guzzlers. In Chicago, Illinois, Chaffin recorded six songs with John & Emery McClung for Paramount Records. These records were released as by Cleve Chaffin and The McClung Brothers. Chaffin continued his professional music career, but never recorded again.  He died on December 10, 1959 in Huntington, West Virginia at the age of 74.

Chafin died in Huntington, West Virginia at the age of 74. He was never married.

According to the Thirteenth Census of the United States in 1910, a Cleve Chafin, who was born in Kentucky and aged 22, was a prisoner at the city jail in Cabell County, West Virginia at the time of the census.

Discography

Unreleased 1927 Gennett recordings
 Sweet Bunch of Daisies
 Aged Mother
 The Night My Mother Died
 Curtain Of Night
 Wreck Of The C&O
 Railroad Bill

Cleve Chaffin & The McClung Brothers
 Babylon Is Falling Down/I Got A Home In The Beulah Land (Paramount #3160) (3/1929)
 Trail Blazer's Favorites/Alabama Jubilee (Paramount #3161) (3/1929)
 Rock House Gamblers/Curtains Of Night (Paramount #3170) (3/1929)

Various artists compilations
 My Rough And Rowdy Ways Volume One (Yazoo #2039) (1998)
 Old Time Music Of West Virginia Volume Two (County #CD-3519) (1999)
 The Half Ain’t Never Been Told Volume Two (Yazoo #2050) (1999)
 Country Music Classic (Vintage78 #C-53) (cassette)
 Paramount Old Time Recordings (JSP) (3-CD set) (2006)

Notes

External links
 [  Allmusic]
  Find A Grave Memorial

1885 births
1959 deaths
Old-time musicians
Gennett Records artists